The National Museum of Funeral History is a museum in Houston, Texas, that contains a collection of artifacts and relics that aim to "educate the public and preserve the heritage of death care." The 35,000-square-foot museum opened in 1992.

Features
The museum is home to "the country's largest collection of funeral service artifacts and features renowned exhibits on one of man's oldest cultural customs," according to its website. For its hallmark exhibit, Celebrating the Lives and Deaths of the Popes, the museum collaborated with the Vatican to highlight the ceremonies surrounding papal funerals. As of October 2020, the museum has a presidential exhibit, including Abraham Lincoln's death mask.  

Displays go back in time as far as Ancient Egyptian funerary practices and include items like hearses and unusual coffins. It also devotes space for a Presidential Funeral Gallery.  Among other items, it has the original $99.25 funeral bill for George Washington.

References

External links 
 

Death customs
Museums in Houston
Museums established in 1992
1992 establishments in Texas